The Tyrrhenian Sea is part of the Mediterranean Sea off the western coast of Italy. It is named for the Tyrrhenian people identified with the Etruscans of Italy.

Geography
The sea is bounded by the islands of Corsica and Sardinia (to the west), the Italian Peninsula (regions of Tuscany, Lazio, Campania, Basilicata, and Calabria) to the north and east, and the island of Sicily (to the south). The Tyrrhenian Sea also includes a number of smaller islands like Capri, Elba, Ischia, and Ustica.

The Tyrrhenian Sea is situated near where the African and Eurasian Plates meet; therefore mountain chains and active volcanoes such as Mount Marsili are found in its depths. The eight Aeolian Islands and Ustica are located in the southern part of the sea, north of Sicily.

Extent
The International Hydrographic Organization defines the limits of the Tyrrhenian Sea as follows:
 In the Strait of Messina: A line joining the North extreme of Cape Paci (15°42′E) with the East extreme of the Island of Sicily, Cape Peloro (38°16′N).
 On the Southwest: A line running from Cape Lilibeo (West extreme of Sicily) to the South extreme of Cape Teulada (8°38′E) in Sardinia.
 In the Strait of Bonifacio: A line joining the West extreme of Cape Testa (41°14′N) in Sardinia with the Southwest extreme of Cape Feno (41°23′N) in Corsica.
 On the North: A line joining Cape Corse (Cape Grosso, 9°23′E) in Corsica, with Tinetto Island and thence through Tino and Palmaria islands to San Pietro Point on the coast of Italy.

Exits
There are four exits from the Tyrrhenian Sea (north to south):

Basins
The Tyrrhenian Basin is divided into two basins (or plains), the Vavilov plain and the Marsili plain. They are separated by the undersea ridge known as the Issel Bridge, after Arturo Issel.

Geology 
The Tyrrhenian Sea is a back-arc basin that formed due to the rollback of the Calabrian slab towards South-East during the Neogene.  Episodes of fast and slow trench retreat formed first the Vavilov basin and, then, the Marsili basin.  Submarine volcanoes and the active volcano Mount Stromboli formed because trench retreat produces extension in the overriding plate allowing the mantle to rise below the surface and partially melt. The magmatism here is also affected by the fluids released from the slab.

Name
Its name derives from the Greek name for the Etruscans, first mentioned by Hesiod in the 8th century BC who described them as residing in central Italy alongside the Latins. The Etruscans lived along the coast of modern Tuscany and northern Latium and referred to the water as the "Sea of the Etruscans".

Islands 

Islands of the Tyrrhenian Sea include:
 Corsica
 Sardinia
 Sicily
 Tuscan Archipelago 
 Ischia
 Procida
 Capri 
 Ustica
 Aeolian Islands (including Lipari and Stromboli)
 Pontine Islands including Ponza

Ports

The main ports of the Tyrrhenian Sea in Italy are: Naples, Palermo, Civitavecchia (Rome), Salerno, Trapani, and Gioia Tauro. In Corsica, the most important port is Bastia.

Note that even though the phrase "port of Rome" is frequently used, there is in fact no port in Rome.

Giglio Porto is a small island port in this area. It rose to prominence, when the Costa Concordia ran aground near the coast of Giglio and sank. The ship was later refloated and towed to Genoa for scrapping.

Winds
In Greek mythology, it is believed that the cliffs above the Tyrrhenian Sea housed the four winds kept by Aeolus. The winds are the Mistral from the Rhône valley, the Libeccio from the southwest, and the Sirocco and Ostro from the south.

Image gallery

References

 
Marginal seas of the Mediterranean
Seas of Italy
Seas of France
European seas
Back-arc basins
Landforms of Basilicata
Landforms of Calabria
Landforms of Campania
Landforms of Lazio
Landforms of Tuscany
Landforms of Sicily
Landforms of Corsica
Geography of Western Europe
Geography of Southern Europe